Michael Goldberg (May 8, 1959 – October 2, 2014) was an American screenwriter.

A graduate of University of Michigan and Carnegie Mellon University, Goldberg scripted the films Cool Runnings (1993), Little Giants (1994) and Snow Dogs (2002).

Goldberg died October 2, 2014, of brain and sinus cancer at the age of 55. His funeral was held four days later in Philadelphia.

References

External links 

1959 births
2014 deaths
20th-century American screenwriters
21st-century American screenwriters
American male screenwriters
Carnegie Mellon University College of Fine Arts alumni
Deaths from brain cancer in the United States
Deaths from cancer in California
Neurological disease deaths in California
University of Michigan alumni
20th-century American male writers
21st-century American male writers